The sixth cabinet of Gheorghe Tătărăscu was the government of Romania from 11 May to 3 July 1940.

Ministers
The ministers of the cabinet were as follows:

President of the Council of Ministers:
Gheorghe Tătărăscu (11 May - 3 July 1940)
Minister of the Interior:
Mihail Ghelmegeanu (11 May - 3 July 1940)
Minister of Foreign Affairs: 
Grigore Gafencu (11 May - 1 June 1940)
Ion Gigurtu (1 - 28 June 1940)
Constantin Argetoianu (28 June - 3 July 1940)
Minister of Finance:
Mitiță Constantinescu (11 May - 3 July 1940)
Minister of Justice:
Aurelian Bentoiu (11 May - 3 July 1940)
Minister of National Defence:
Gen. Ioan Ilcuș (11 May - 3 July 1940)
Minister of Air and Marine:
(interim) Gen. Ioan Ilcuș (11 May - 3 July 1940)
Minister of Materiel:
Victor Slăvescu (11 May - 3 July 1940)
Minister of National Economy:
Mircea Cancicov (11 May - 3 July 1940)
Minister of Agriculture and Property
Gheorghe Ionescu-Sisești (11 May - 3 July 1940)
Minister of Public Works and Communications:
Ion Gigurtu (11 May - 1 June 1940)
Ion Macovei (1 June - 3 July 1940)
Minister of Foreign Trade:
Ion Christu (11 May - 28 June 1940)
(interim) Mircea Cancicov (28 June - 3 July 1940)
Minister of National Education:
Petre Andrei (11 May - 3 July 1940)
Minister of Religious Affairs and the Arts:
Ștefan Ciobanu (11 May - 28 June 1940)
Constantin C. Giurescu (28 June - 3 July 1940)
Minister of Labour:
Mihail Ralea (11 May - 3 July 1940)
Minister of Health and Social Security
Nicolae Hortolomei (11 May - 3 July 1940)
Minister of Public Wealth:
Traian Pop (11 May - 3 July 1940)
Minister of Propaganda:
Constantin C. Giurescu (11 May - 28 June 1940)
Teofil Sidorovici (28 June - 3 July 1940)
Minister of State for Minorities:
Silviu Dragomir (11 May - 3 July 1940)
Minister Secretary of State of the Presidency of the Council of Ministers:
Radu Portocală (11 May - 28 June 1940)
Minister Secretary of State:
Ernest Urdăreanu (11 May - 28 June 1940)
Alexandru Vaida-Voevod (28 June - 3 July 1940)
Ion Inculeț (28 June - 3 July 1940)
Ion Nistor (28 June - 3 July 1940)

References

Cabinets of Romania
Cabinets established in 1940
Cabinets disestablished in 1940
1940 establishments in Romania
1940 disestablishments in Romania